The 1965 FIBA Intercontinental Cup Test Tournament was the test edition of the FIBA Intercontinental Cup. The game was contested by S.C. Corinthians Paulista, and the 1965 FIBA European Champions Cup (EuroLeague) champions, Real Madrid.

The 1965 FIBA Intercontinental Cup Test was played with a single-game format, in São Paulo, Brazil, on 5 July 1965.

Venue
The championship game was held at the Ginásio Poliesportivo Parque São Jorge, the home arena of S.C. Corinthians Paulista. The arena is located in São Paulo, Brazil. The arena opened in 1963, and it has a seating capacity of 7,000 people, with a standing room capacity of 10,000.

Match details
The game was contested between S.C. Corinthians Paulista of the Brazilian Championship, and the FIBA European Champions Cup (EuroLeague) champions, Real Madrid of the Spanish Primera División. Wlamir Marques of S.C. Corinthians Paulista, was the game's top scorer, with 51 points.

References

External links
FIBA official website
Corinthians 118 x 109 Real Madrid-ESP (1965)

1965
1965 in basketball
1965–66 in South American basketball
International basketball competitions hosted by Brazil